Talking Stick Resort Amphitheatre (originally known as the Desert Sky Pavilion and most recently known as Ak-Chin Pavilion) is an amphitheater located in Phoenix, Arizona, which seats 8,106 under a pavilion roof and an additional 12,000 on a hillside behind the main stands. It opened on November 11, 1990 (Billy Joel was the venue's inaugural performer). The naming rights sponsor is Talking Stick Resort (the venue is not located on tribal land). With a total capacity of 20,000, its capacity is higher than Footprint Center and Desert Diamond Arena. The amphitheater's season starts in April and closes in October.

About
Whitney Houston performed at the venue on May 19, 1991, during her I'm Your Baby Tonight World Tour.

Steely Dan played their Alive in America tour here in 1994.

The lawn at the amphitheater contains several video screens.

R.E.M. recorded two tracks off their 1996 studio album New Adventures in Hi-Fi there.

The Spice Girls performed at the venue on August 22, 1998, during their debut Spiceworld Tour.

The amphitheater has been used to hold many famous concerts and tours, especially in the summer months of July and August, it has hosted Nine Inch Nails, Van Halen, Bon Jovi, Metallica, The Vote for Change Tour, The Vans Warped Tour, The Gigantour, Lollapalooza, Lilith Fair, Crüe Fest, Ozzfest and Projekt Revolution. It has hosted the Phoenix date of the annual Mayhem Festival since the tour's inception in July 2008.

Fall Out Boy recorded their live album, Live in Phoenix, at the amphitheatre on June 22, 2007.

Green Day recorded their song, "Cigarettes and Valentines", for their live album, Awesome as Fuck, here.

Fall Out Boy & Paramore brought their co-headlining tour, MONUMENTOUR to The Pavilion on August 8, 2014 with New Politics as the opening act. Lana Del Rey, accompanied by Courtney Love, brought her Endless Summer Tour to The Pavilion on May 14, 2015.

See also

List of historic properties in Phoenix, Arizona
List of contemporary amphitheatres
Ak-Chin Indian Community
Live Nation

References

External links
Venue Web Site

Amphitheaters in the United States
Buildings and structures in Phoenix, Arizona
Culture of Phoenix, Arizona
Music venues in Arizona
Phoenix Points of Pride
Tourist attractions in Phoenix, Arizona
Music venues completed in 1990